Epiphyas loxotoma is a species of moth of the family Tortricidae. It is found in Australia, where it has been recorded from Tasmania. The habitat consists of wet eucalypt forests.

The wingspan is about 27 mm.

References

Moths described in 1927
Epiphyas